Moulettes are an English art rock band that combines elements of rock, progressive, folk and pop music. The band was formed in 2002 in Glastonbury, England by Hannah Miller (vocals, cello), Ruth Skipper (vocals, bassoon), Robert Skipper (later of The Holloways), Oliver Austin (drums, vocals) and Ted Dwane (bass guitar). 

The current lineup is Hannah Miller (cello, vocals, guitar), Oliver Austin (drums, guitar, synthesizer), Raevennan Husbandes (vocals, guitar), Jules Arthur (synthesizer, viola, backing vocals), Mikey Simmonds (violin, viola, nyckelharpa, backing vocals)

Moulettes are a band of multi-instrumentalists who experiment with the interplay between electric and acoustic instruments through effects and distortion. Led by either a 4, 5 or 6 string cello; the band uses three-part vocal harmony and often incorporates orchestral and progressive elements into their music. They occasionally play with a chamber orchestra, or in larger ensembles which include Georgina Leach (violin), Mikey Simmonds (violin), Anisa Arslanagic, Emma Gatrill (harp), Kate Young (violin), Eliza Jaye (violin and guitar), Marcus Hamblett (guitar, brass), Rob Arcari (percussion), Laura Hockenhull (vocals) and Faye Houston (vocals). Their main influences include Björk, Kate Bush, Gentle Giant, Nick Cave and the Bad Seeds, The Dirty Three, The Beatles and Pink Floyd. The band have received positive reviews from mainstream press which has acknowledged their original sound.  The band have been nominated for several Best of The Year lists, and won Spiral Earth's Best Band and Album categories and won Featea Roots Music's best band of 2012. Having toured extensively and played at many festivals since their inception, Moulettes have shared the stage and studio with Seasick Steve, John Paul Jones, The Ting Tings, Mumford and Sons, Band of Skulls, Paul Heaton, Bonobo, Liz Green, The Unthanks, Arthur Brown and many more.

Early years: 2002–09
Hannah Miller, Ruth Skipper, Robert Skipper, Oliver Austin and Ted Dwane met at school in Glastonbury and Winchester.
During and after they left college the band Miller, Ruth Skipper, Robert Skipper, Austin, Dwane and eventually Georgina Leach were playing regularly in London and Manchester together. They put on the notorious 'Den of Iniquity' nights at the 12 bar playing their strange flavour of folk-inspired music alongside other up and coming Indie bands of the time including The Noisettes, Patrick Wolf and Mystery Jets. Moulettes were amongst many bands who played at The Mystery Jets Parties on Eel Pie Island, dubbed "The White Cross Revival". 

Very soon after this point Laura Marling and Mumford & Sons recruited Ted Dwane, Robert Skipper left to join The Holloways, and Leach went to live in Australia. Determined to document the many songs that had been played live during that period, Miller, Ruth Skipper, and Austin became a newly arranged three-piece band. It was on this foundation that the unique sound for the first album was made. During this period Austin, Ruth Skipper, and Miller also helped found the Sotones Music co-operative label in Southampton and released their first split single, Wilderness, with Peter Lyons. However, after a few years of seeing Moulettes at 'The Den of Iniquity', Seasick Steve's previous management and label, who had been courting the band for a while, offered to release the upcoming album on Balling the Jack records.

Moulettes – (Debut): 2009–11 

The album was recorded in Winchester at Valley Studios where Robert Skipper and Oliver Austin originally met. The album was mixed by Neil Kennedy at The Ranch in Southampton. Near the end of the sessions, Leach announced her return from Australia and recorded on several of the tracks. These last stages of the sessions also saw the recruitment of Rob Arcari and a guest vocal appearance from Emma Richardson of Band of Skulls on "Requiem". The band toured the record in the UK and Europe as a quintet.

The Bear's Revenge: 2011–12 

The band returned to Winchester to record with Ben Startup and joined forces with Joe Gibb (Leftfield, Catatonia, Kinks) to co-produce their second album.
The sessions saw the return of Ted Dwane on double bass and the addition of Jim Mortimore, Laura Hockenhull of the Copper Family, and Faye Houston. Guest appearances include Liz Green on 'Blood And Thunder', Banjoist Matt Menefee (Cadillac Sky, Chessboxer) and Ríoghnach Connolly (folk singer, flute and whistle).

Miller, Ruth Skipper, Austin, Leach, Arcari and Mortimore toured for the album. During this period the band played many festivals, including Cropredy, and toured with the Levellers, The Crazy World of Arthur Brown, Mumford and Sons and a support show with Seasick Steve at the Hammersmith Apollo. Georgina Leach and Rob Arcari left the band by the end of the album tour.

Constellations: 2013–2015 

The band's third album was released on 2 June 2014 on Navigator Records. Miller, Austin, Mortimore and Ruth Skipper began pre-production at their home studios and at Metway Studios with Al Scott (the Levellers) and re-located to Lewes Old Foundry studios. Joe Gibb returned to co-produce the album with band member Oliver Austin. The album session saw many Brighton and Sussex players getting involved as well as some from further afield from a variety of music disciplines. Special guests include:

Herbie Flowers (Lou Reed, David Bowie, T-Rex, War of the Worlds), Arthur Brown, Emma Richardson (Band of skulls), Blaine Harrison (Mystery Jets), The Unthanks, Nick Pynn (Stewart Lee, The Incredible String Band), Emma Gatrill (Sons of Noel and Adrian), Marcus Hamblett (Laura Marling, Willy Mason, Eyes and no Eyes), Dan Smith (Noisettes), Anja McClosky (The Irrepressibles), Faye Houston (The Resonators), Campbell Austin (T S Idiot, Moneytree), Laura Hockenhull, Matt Gest, Anisa Arslanagic, Mikey Simmonds (The Mountain Firework Company, Alice Russell, Bonobo), Nick Cave, Bjorn Dahlberg, Fredrik Kinbom, Laura Impallomeni and Bruce Stephens.

Miller, Ruth Skipper, Austin, Mortimore and Anisa Arslanagic began to tour the album and were joined by Emma Gatrill, Kate Young and Eliza Jaye at different stages. The band once again played many festivals including Stage 2 (Cambridge Folk Festival), Avalon stage (Glastonbury Festival) and Bestival and supported Bellowhead.

Founding member Rob Skipper died on 3 October 2014 from a heroin overdose shortly after moving to Brighton.

Preternatural: 2015–2017 

Moulettes' fourth album saw the addition of their newest member, Raevennan Husbandes, on guitar and Vocals. The album's lyrical content deals with strange creatures and the natural world. It was produced by the band, mixed by Jim Mortimore, and recorded in the home studio of Malcolm Mortimore after a headline tour in UK, Germany, Netherlands, and Canada with Three Friends. The band continued to tour Canada and all over Europe. In June 2016 Ruth Skipper, having juggled between the band and her medical career for several campaigns, decided to quit the band and commit to her doctoring career.

The album received positive reviews from many factions of the industry. 
“Huge, complex and compelling. One of the most thrillingly nimble musical ensembles the UK has produced in decades. Lead singer must be a national treasure soon... ” Prog Magazine

"Equal parts Kronos quartet, Roxy Music, Frank Zappa, Kate Bush...echoes of early Pink Floyd, Bowie and Radiohead...the electronica of Kraftwerk and the acoustic melody of Pentangle. Precise, carefully crafted and genre defying"- R2

“Redefines the term 'Progressive' for a new era”– Fatea Magazine

We the Collective: 2018–present 
The band announced their first break from touring as Moulettes in 16 years. However, Miller, Austin, Mortimore, and returning, Anisa Arslanagic on viola and Mike Simmonds on violin,  were asked to do some arrangement and playing on The Levellers new album We the Collective. The Album session and following tour saw some of the band joining the Levellers on the road. The album was recorded in Studio 2 at Abbey Road Studios with John Leckie (Radiohead, The Bends). They toured together all over UK (including Winchester Cathedral, Europe and various Festivals in the spring and summer of 2018 including headline shows at Fairport's Cropredy Convention, Moseley Folk, Beautiful Days, Y Not Festival, The Eden Project and more. We the Collective Hit Number 12 in the UK charts.

Stop Gap Dance Show: 2018–present 
The band also collaborated with Stop Gap Dance Company. The company are committed to making discoveries about integrating disabled and non-disabled people through dance. The company choreographed a show to Moulettes music.

Xenolalia: 2018-present 

The band began writing for Album 5 in May 2018 and started recording at The Rosehill Studios and Metway studios in Brighton. Old and new members are writing a new set of songs to be reimagined with five different arrangements on five different albums: rock, acoustic, horns, a capella, and electronic. The band have a few UK dates this summer, a Canadian tour and some headline shows from October through December. There is no release date set. Guest artists confirmed are Rioghnach Connolly, Yazz Ahmed, Resonators, Wallis Bird, Lee Westwood, and Charlotte Glasson. Returning members include Ted Dwane, Georgina Leach, Anisa Arslanagic, Mike Simmonds, Laura Impallomeni, Jim Mortimore, Emma Gatrill.

References

External links
 Official website
 

English art rock groups
English progressive rock groups
English folk rock groups
Psychedelic folk groups
English experimental rock groups
English pop music groups
Chamber pop musicians